The enzyme ADP-dependent medium-chain-acyl-CoA hydrolase (EC 3.1.2.19) catalyzes the reaction

acyl-CoA + H2O  CoA + a carboxylate

This enzyme belongs to the family of hydrolases, specifically those acting on thioester bonds.  The systematic name is ADP-dependent-medium-chain-acyl-CoA hydrolase. Other names in common use include medium-chain acyl coenzyme A hydrolase, medium-chain acyl-CoA hydrolase, medium-chain acyl-thioester hydrolase, medium-chain hydrolase, and myristoyl-CoA thioesterase.  It employs one cofactor, ADP.  At least one compound, NADH is known to inhibit this enzyme.

References

 

EC 3.1.2
Enzymes of unknown structure